The Alberta Boilers Safety Authority, also known as ABSA is a pressure equipment safety authority authorized by the government of the Canadian province of Alberta to administer and deliver safety programs related to boilers, pressure vessels, and pressure piping systems. ABSA is also responsible for the certification of pressure welders, inspectors and power engineers for the operation of a power or heating boiler. ABSA is located in Edmonton, Alberta, Canada.

External links
Alberta Boilers Safety Association (ABSA)

Standards organizations in Canada
Organizations based in Edmonton